

Alphege (or Ælfheah) was the third Anglo-Saxon Bishop of Wells. He was consecrated in January 926, and died around 937.

At the start of the reign of King Æthelstan in 924, Alphege was a member of his household, one of his mass priests, who were probably responsible for looking after his relics. Early in Æthelstan's reign, Alphege witnessed his manumission of a slave called Ealdred, and he also attested a charter on the day of Æthelstan's coronation, 4 September 925. He was appointed Bishop of Wells in succession to Wulfhelm, who had been translated to the Archbishopric of Canterbury.

Citations

References

External links
 

Bishops of Wells
937 deaths
Year of birth unknown
10th-century English bishops